The Bankaw revolt (1621–1622) was a religious uprising against Spanish colonial rule led by Bankaw or Bancao (which per Sanchez dictionary and Alcina's account, the word means "spear" in Waray), datu of Limasawa, Carigara, Abuyog, Sogod (now part of southern Leyte). He warmly accepted Miguel Lopez de Legazpi when he arrived in the Philippines in 1564, and was converted as a Christian. Being hospitable toward de Legazpi and his men, he received a letter of gratitude from the Spanish King, Philip II. He also received a gift from the king in recognition of his grandfather's hospitality to Ferdinand Magellan. Though he was one of the first converts of Catholicism under de Legazpi, he left his faith and allegiance to the Spanish after around fifty years. Together with a babaylan named Pagali and his children, he built a temple for a diwata, and he incited people from six towns to participate in the revolt. It is believed that Pagali used some magic to attract followers, and thought that they could turn the Spaniards into clay by hurling bits of earth at them.

Parish priest Father Melchor de Vera went to Cebu to report the insurrection. The rebellion was suppressed by Juan de Alcarazo, the alcalde mayor of Cebu, and the Spanish and Filipino colonial troops in forty ships sent by Governor-General Alonso Fajardo de Entenza. Encamping within the temple for a diwata, the Spaniards burned it down after ten days. Bankaw's head was pierced in a bamboo stake and was displayed for the public to serve as a warning. His son was beheaded, and one babaylan was burned at the stake. Three other followers were executed by a firing squad. In order to dispel the blindness caused by the influence of diwata, eighty one rebel priests were burned. Some rebels were captured, including the daughter and son of Bankaw.

References

External links

17th-century rebellions
History of Leyte (province)
History of Southern Leyte
Rebellions in the Philippines
1621 in the Philippines
1622 in the Philippines